Carleete was the stage name of Harry Howes, born 8 May 1873, who claimed to be the inventor of the Water Escape trick, also known as the Water Torture Cell, Under Water Escape and Mysterious Cask. This trick was sold to Harry Houdini in 1911. The sale happened during a visit of Houdini to 194 Salt Street, Bradford, England, then the home of Harry Howes.

Overview
Carleete senior was an "inventor and maker of all things magical" who took on commissions for magical apparatus and lived in Bradford, England. He was also a performer and his son, Osmond Beecroft Howes, born 25 September 1897, later took over the Carleete stage name. Carleete senior was visited by Houdini on a number of occasions, including whilst Houdini was on a tour in 1914.

References

Escapologists